Monica Rundqvist (born 15 March 1962 in Vårgårda) is a Swedish sport shooter. She tied for 11th place in the women's 10 metre air pistol event and tied for 33rd place in the women's 25 metre pistol event at the 2000 Summer Olympics.

References

1962 births
Living people
Swedish female sport shooters
Olympic shooters of Sweden
Shooters at the 2000 Summer Olympics
21st-century Swedish women